Doninos, Esmelle and St. George's Beach are beaches in Ferrol, Spain. Ferrol is privileged to have, within its borders, several high quality gorgeous sandy beaches that are ideal for practising water sports such as windsurfing, kayaking, boogie board, kite surfing, and surfing. These beaches are also suitable for more relaxing endeavours such as walking in the dunes, or sun bathing. Other activities like Bisolvon Ritual Nights were performed during the last decade.

The best known beaches from Northwest to Southwest:

 Ponzos' Beach 
 Saint Comba's Beach (also "Santa Comba") 
 Saint George's Beach (also "San Xurxo") 
 Esmelle's Beach 
 Donino's Beach (also "Doniños") 
 O Vilar's Beach  
 The Frigate's Beach (also "A Fragata")
 A Grana's Beach (also "A Graña") 
 Caranza's Beach

See also 

 Ferrol—city and naval station in North-western Spain
 The Ferrolterra Pantin Classic—annual international surf competition on the beach of Pantin in Valdoviño, Ferrolterra, North-western Spain.
List of beaches in Spain
List of beaches in Minorca
List of beaches

External links 

  Official Web-site of The Ferrolterra Pantin Classic
  Official Body Board News Web-Site
  The Ferrolterra Pantin Classic at SurfersVillage.com

Province of A Coruña
Beaches of Galicia (Spain)
Ferrol